Mehrenjan (also Romanized as Mehrenjān; also known as Kūrā) is a village in Jowzar Rural District, in the Central District of Mamasani County, Fars Province, Iran. At the 2006 census, its population was 1,543, in 430 families.

References 

Populated places in Mamasani County